This is a list of seasons played by Real Sociedad Femenino, the women's team of Real Sociedad, a Spanish football club from San Sebastián. Real Sociedad competes in the top-tier Primera División and plays in the Zubieta Facilities in Usurbil.

Summary

References

women
Real Sociedad Women
Real Sociedad